The 2009 Vietnamese National Football Second League has 16 teams, both professional and semi-professional, is divided into 3 groups, 2 groups with 5 teams and 1 group with 6 teams.

Teams play in a round robin format. the 3 top teams as well as the best 2nd team with most points qualifies for promotion playoff.

The 2 winners are promoted to the Vietnam First Division. No teams are relegated and no foreign players are permitted to play.

Vietnamese Second Division seasons
3